The Van Diemen RF93, and its evolution, the RF94, were open-wheel formula race car chassis, designed, developed, and built by British manufacturer and race car constructor Van Diemen, for Formula Ford race categories, in 1993.

References 

Open wheel racing cars
Formula Ford cars